Cairo is an unincorporated community in Sumner County, Tennessee.

It is the location of Cairo Rosenwald School, a historic Rosenwald School open during 1923 to 1959 that is listed on the National Register of Historic Places.

References

Unincorporated communities in Sumner County, Tennessee
Unincorporated communities in Tennessee